Matthew James Lodge (born 3 June 1968) is a British diplomat. Since September 2021, he has been Ambassador to Greece. Previously, he served as UK Ambassador to Finland (2010–2013) and UK Ambassador to Kuwait (2014–2017).

Early life and education
Lodge was born on 3 June 1968 in Crosby, Lancashire, England. He was educated at Abingdon School, a private school in Oxfordshire.

Military service
On 10 September 1986, Lodge was commissioned in the Royal Marines as a second lieutenant, with seniority in that rank from 1 September 1986. Having been awarded a university cadetship, he studied modern languages (French and Russian) at the University of Birmingham, graduating with a Bachelor of Arts (BA Hons) degree. He reached the rank of lieutenant, before retiring from the Royal Marines on 4 May 1996 after ten years of service.

Diplomatic career
Lodge joined the Foreign and Commonwealth Office (FCO) in 1996. His early appointments were initially focused on the Balkans and the Eastern Mediterranean. He was private secretary to the Permanent Under-Secretary of State for Foreign Affairs from 2004 to 2007. He was deputy head of mission at the British Embassy in Baghdad, Iraq in 2007, and then attended the Higher Command and Staff Course in 2008.

From 2008 to 2010, Lodge was head of the Afghanistan Group in the FCO. He served as Her Majesty's Ambassador to Finland from 2010 to 2013, and Her Majesty's Ambassador to the State of Kuwait from 2014 to 2017. In 2017, he was made a minister at the British Embassy in Paris, in addition to serving as ambassador and permanent delegate to the United Nations Educational, Scientific and Cultural Organization (UNESCO). He was promoted to deputy head of mission in 2020. In December 2020, it was announced that he would be the next British Ambassador to Greece. He presented his credentials to Katerina Sakellaropoulou, President of the Hellenic Republic, on 22 September 2021.

References

Living people
Ambassadors of the United Kingdom to Finland
Ambassadors of the United Kingdom to Greece
Ambassadors of the United Kingdom to Kuwait
1968 births
People from Crosby, Merseyside
People educated at Abingdon School
Alumni of the University of Birmingham
Royal Marines officers